Pleasant Home is an unincorporated community in Wayne County, in the U.S. state of Ohio.

History
Pleasant Home was platted at an unknown date. A post office called Pleasant Home was established in 1873, and remained in operation until 1902.

References

Unincorporated communities in Wayne County, Ohio
Unincorporated communities in Ohio